Gonzalo Jesús Rodríguez (born 29 October 1987) is a retired Argentine footballer who plays as a midfielder.

Career
Real Arroyo Seco gave Rodríguez his first appearance in senior football, selecting him once during Torneo Argentino A action in 2005. In 2008, Rodríguez joined Torneo Argentino B's Juventud Unida. Five years later, following seventeen goals in one hundred and eighteen matches, the club were promoted to Torneo Argentino A; which preceded a further promotion to Primera B Nacional during 2014. 2016 saw Rodríguez spend time with Juventud Urdinarrain and Achirense, prior to playing for Independiente de Gualeguaychú in 2017. Months later, Chaco For Ever of Torneo Federal A signed Rodríguez.

Rodríguez scored goals against San Jorge and Gimnasia y Tiro as Chaco For Ever placed seventh. On 30 June 2018, Rodríguez agreed to join Torneo Federal A's Gimnasia y Esgrima. He made his debut against former club Juventud Unida on 15 September, with his new team winning 0–2. In July 2019, after one goal in nineteen matches for Gimnasia, Rodríguez would return to Juventud Unida for a second spell.

Career statistics
.

References

External links

1987 births
Living people
Place of birth missing (living people)
Argentine footballers
Association football midfielders
Torneo Argentino A players
Torneo Argentino B players
Primera Nacional players
Torneo Federal A players
Real Arroyo Seco footballers
Juventud Unida de Gualeguaychú players
Chaco For Ever footballers
Gimnasia y Esgrima de Concepción del Uruguay footballers